Maggie's Plan is a 2015 American romantic comedy-drama film directed and written by Rebecca Miller, based on the original story by Karen Rinaldi (later published as the 2017 novel The End of Men). The film stars Greta Gerwig, Ethan Hawke, Bill Hader, Maya Rudolph, Travis Fimmel, Wallace Shawn, Monte Greene, Ida Rohatyn, and Julianne Moore.

The film had its world premiere at the 2015 Toronto International Film Festival on September 12, 2015. Sony Pictures Classics released the film on May 20, 2016.

Synopsis 
Maggie Hardin, the director of business development and outreach for the art and design students at the New School, decides she wants to have a child, and enlists a former college acquaintance, Guy Childers, a math major and pickle entrepreneur, to donate his sperm.

At the university, she gets to know John Harding, a "ficto-critical anthropologist", who is married to a tenured professor at Columbia University. Repeatedly bumping into each other on campus, John confides in Maggie that he is writing a novel. Maggie begins reading it, and they start meeting on a regular basis to talk about the novel.

Maggie attempts to inseminate herself, but is interrupted by the doorbell. It is John, who confesses that he is in love with her and wants to be the father of her child.

Three years later, Maggie and John are married, and they have a daughter, Lily. Maggie repeatedly finds herself having to put her professional goals on the back burner to take care of Lily and her two step-children, and to support John's writing. Taking Lily for a walk, she runs into Guy, who initially thinks Lily is his daughter, but Maggie tells him that Lily is John's child.

Maggie goes to see Georgette, John's ex-wife, at a book signing. She approaches Georgette and tells her that she knows Georgette is still in love with John, and that she wants to help them get back together. Georgette decides to go along with the plan, and asks for Maggie's help getting John to attend a conference which she will also be attending. At the conference, Georgette and John make up and sleep together. Returning home, John confesses everything to Maggie, who tells him he belongs with Georgette.

John accidentally learns that Maggie had planned to re-unite him with Georgette. He leaves Maggie and Lily, and disappears for a while. Maggie goes to speak to Georgette, in order to try to find out any news about John, and ends up taking Georgette and the children to her home, where Georgette spends the day reading John's novel. Meeting with him later, she tells him her opinion about the novel. Realizing that she knows him better than he knows himself, John forgives Georgette for her part in the scheme, and they re-unite.

Sometime later, the blended family goes out ice-skating. Maggie is surprised when Lily begins to recite numbers, as neither she nor John are mathematically inclined. She sees Guy walking towards the ice rink.

Cast 

 Greta Gerwig as Maggie Hardin
 Ethan Hawke as John Harding
 Julianne Moore as Georgette Nørgaard
 Bill Hader as Tony
 Maya Rudolph as Felicia 
 Travis Fimmel as Guy Childers
 Wallace Shawn as Kliegler
 Ida Rohatyn as Lily Harding
 Alex Morf as Al Bentwaithe
 Jackson Frazer as Paul Harding
 Mina Sundwall as Justine Harding
 Fredi Walker-Browne as Beverly
 Monte Greene as Max

Production 
On January 9, 2014, it was announced that director Rebecca Miller and Greta Gerwig would re-team on rom-com Maggie's Plan to direct and star, respectively, scripted by Miller and based on the story by Karen Rinaldi. Rachael Horovitz was set to produce through Specialty Films along with Miller and Damon Cardasis through their Round Films. Julianne Moore was added to the cast of the film on January 15, 2014. Clive Owen had joined on May 1, 2014, although he did not appear in the finished film, while on February 2, 2015, Travis Fimmel joined the film's cast. On February 3, 2015, Variety reported that Ethan Hawke, Bill Hader, and Maya Rudolph had joined the film.

Filming 
Filming began on February 23, 2015, in New York City.

Release 
The film had its world premiere at the 2015 Toronto International Film Festival during its 40th anniversary on September 12, 2015. Shortly after Sony Pictures Classics acquired distribution rights to the film. The film had its U.S. premiere at the New York Film Festival on October 4, 2015. It also went on to screen at the Sundance Film Festival on January 22, 2016, and the 66th Berlin International Film Festival on February 15, 2016. After a New York invitation-only premiere on May 5, 2016, the film was released in the United States on May 20, 2016.

Critical response
Maggie's Plan received positive reviews from film critics. It holds an 86% "Fresh" rating on review aggregator website Rotten Tomatoes, based on 185 reviews, with an average rating of 7.10/10. The site's consensus reads: "With a typically absorbing performance from Greta Gerwig leading the way, Maggie's Plan gives rom-com sensibilities a smart, subversive twist." On Metacritic, the film holds a rating of 76 out of 100, based on 35 critics, indicating "generally favorable reviews".

Variety's Dennis Harvey described it as "nicely crafted on all levels", with "Greta Gerwig, Ethan Hawke, and Julianne Moore making a pleasing triangle in Rebecca Miller's offbeat romantic comedy". Richard Lawson from Vanity Fair praised the film as "A smart, goofy delight!", highlighting Julianne Moore's "comedy chops" and praising the rest of the cast as being in "near-perfect harmony, creating a lively, inviting hum". Other critics also pointed out Julianne Moore's performance as "scene-stealing", including Nigel M. Smith from The Guardian: "Maggie's Plan serves as a strong reminder for what a comedic force Moore can be when served by the right material." He also singled out Gerwig for "effortlessly leading most of the picture".

References

External links 
 
 

2015 films
2015 independent films
Films directed by Rebecca Miller
Films shot in New York City
Films set in New York City
American romantic comedy films
2015 romantic comedy films
Sony Pictures Classics films
2010s American films